This is a list of episodes of the American situation comedy The Jeffersons.  A total of 253 episodes aired on CBS over 11 seasons, from January 18, 1975, through July 2, 1985.

Series overview

Episodes

Season 1 (1975)

Season 2 (1975–76)

Season 3 (1976–77)

Season 4 (1977–78)

Season 5 (1978–79)

Season 6 (1979–80)

Season 7 (1980–81)

Season 8 (1981–82)

Season 9 (1982–83)

Season 10 (1983–84)

Season 11 (1984–85)

Notelist

Sources

References

Episodes
Lists of American sitcom episodes